Kings Grant is a census-designated place (CDP) in New Hanover County, North Carolina, United States. The population was 8,113 at the 2010 census, up from 7,738 in 2000. It is part of the Wilmington Metropolitan Statistical Area.

Geography
Kings Grant is located at  (34.265769, -77.867760).

Demographics

2020 census

As of the 2020 United States census, there were 8,466 people, 3,450 households, and 2,276 families residing in the CDP.

2000 census
As of the census of 2000, there were 7,738 people, 3,011 households, and 2,185 families residing in the CDP. The population density was 1,669.9 people per square mile (645.3/km2). There were 3,152 housing units at an average density of 680.2/sq mi (262.8/km2). The racial makeup of the CDP was 84.34% White, 12.26% African American, 0.52% Native American, 0.94% Asian, 0.04% Pacific Islander, 0.80% from other races, and 1.10% from two or more races. Hispanic or Latino of any race were 1.73% of the population.

There were 3,011 households, out of which 32.8% had children under the age of 18 living with them, 58.5% were married couples living together, 10.5% had a female householder with no husband present, and 27.4% were non-families. 18.8% of all households were made up of individuals, and 4.3% had someone living alone who was 65 years of age or older. The average household size was 2.56 and the average family size was 2.92.

In the CDP, the population was spread out, with 23.6% under the age of 18, 9.2% from 18 to 24, 33.1% from 25 to 44, 25.1% from 45 to 64, and 9.0% who were 65 years of age or older. The median age was 36 years. For every 100 females, there were 99.4 males. For every 100 females age 18 and over, there were 95.7 males.

The median income for a household in the CDP was $46,643, and the median income for a family was $52,071. Males had a median income of $38,688 versus $26,160 for females. The per capita income for the CDP was $19,889. About 3.9% of families and 6.7% of the population were below the poverty line, including 7.4% of those under age 18 and 6.8% of those age 65 or over.

References

Census-designated places in New Hanover County, North Carolina
Census-designated places in North Carolina
Cape Fear (region)